Michaela Ashleigh Robertson (born 28 August 1996) is a New Zealand professional footballer who plays as a forward for Wellington Phoenix. She was part of the New Zealand Football team in the football competition at the 2020 Summer Olympics.

References

Living people
New Zealand women's association footballers
New Zealand women's international footballers
Footballers at the 2020 Summer Olympics
Olympic association footballers of New Zealand
Women's association football forwards
1996 births